Wayne Schimmelbusch  (born 19 January 1953) is a former Australian rules footballer in the (then) Victorian Football League (VFL).

Schimmelbusch played in 306 games, including 29 finals games, for the North Melbourne Football Club, which was then a club games played record. He was recruited in 1973 from the Brunswick Football Club in the Victorian Football Association (VFA), where he won the J. J. Field Trophy as the VFA second division's best and fairest in 1972. His retirement in 1987 was forced due to a serious knee injury sustained during a match against the Sydney Swans.

Schimmelbusch was appointed coach of the North Melbourne Football Club in 1990. The team did not perform well; and, in the 1993 pre-season, after a 147-point loss to Adelaide, Schimmelbusch was sacked and replaced by Denis Pagan, who had previously coached North Melbourne's under-19 and Essendon Football Club's reserves teams.

Schimmelbusch's brother Daryl also played for the North Melbourne Football Club.

Schimmelbusch was inducted into the Australian Football Hall of Fame in 1997 and named in the North Melbourne "Team of the Century" (half-forward flank) in 2001.

References 

 
 North Melbourne Hall of Fame

External links
 

North Melbourne Football Club players
North Melbourne Football Club Premiership players
North Melbourne Football Club coaches
Australian Football Hall of Fame inductees
Victorian State of Origin players
Brunswick Football Club players
1953 births
Living people
Australian rules footballers from Victoria (Australia)
Two-time VFL/AFL Premiership players